The women's tournament of Handball at the 2018 Asian Games at Jakarta, Indonesia was held between 14 and 30 August 2018. The matches were held at the POPKI Sports Hall.

Squads

Results
All times are Western Indonesia Time (UTC+07:00)

Preliminary round

Group A

Group B

Classification 9th–10th

Classification 5th–8th

Semifinals

Classification 7th–8th

Classification 5th–6th

Final round

Semifinals

Bronze medal match

Gold medal match

Final standing

References

External links
Handball at the 2018 Asian Games – Women's tournament

Men